Endeitoma dentata is a species of cylindrical bark beetle in the family Zopheridae.  It is found in North America.

References

Further reading

 
 
 

Zopheridae
Beetles described in 1885